First (and only) Punjab Games were held from 5–11 December 2004, in Patiala city in Indian Punjab .

Some 700 sports persons from both Eastern and Western Punjab competed in following sports:

 Hockey
 Cycling
 Athletics
 Gymnastics
 Polo
 Handball
 Wrestling
 Badminton
 Volleyball
 Tug of war
 Shooting
 Kabaddi

Second Punjab Games 2005 were scheduled to be held in Lahore, the provincial capital of Western Punjab in December 2005; and were postponed, and eventually cancelled, due to 2005 Kashmir earthquake.

Third Punjab Games 2006 were proposed to be held in Jalandhar, however never happened .

Multi-sport events in India
Sport in Punjab, India
2004 in Indian sport